The Midway Drive-In located in Sterling, Illinois is one of 12 drive-in theaters in Illinois.

History
Opened in 1950, it is named for being located midway between Dixon and Sterling, Illinois.

In 2007, the Midway Drive-In was purchased by Mike and Mia Kerz (who are also the founders of the Flashback Weekend Movie Conventions in Rosemont, Illinois). The facility then underwent a two-year renovation. The historic Drive-In Screen Tower was refurbished and painted, the projection booth equipment was upgraded, and the concession stand was restored to its original '50's diner decor, including the retro "spaceship" ticket booth and the children's playground.

See also
 List of drive-in theaters

References

External links 
Official site
Sauk Valley Newspaper
Encounter Lee County
Horror Film Festivals

Drive-in theaters in the United States
Dixon, Illinois
Sterling, Illinois
1950 establishments in Illinois
Buildings and structures in Lee County, Illinois
Tourist attractions in Lee County, Illinois